This article documents the timeline of transmission of COVID-19 during the pandemic in Belarus in 2020.

Timeline

February–March 2020

April 2020

May 2020

June 2020

July 2020

August 2020

September 2020

October 2020

November 2020

December 2020

See also 
 COVID-19 pandemic in Belarus
 2020 in Belarus
 Timeline of the COVID-19 pandemic in Belarus (2021)
 Timeline of the COVID-19 pandemic in Belarus (2022)

References

Belarus